Stephanie D'Hose (born 1 June 1981) is a Belgian politician who has been President of the Senate since October 2020.

Early life and education
D'Hose was born in Roeselare on 1 June 1981. Her parents were self employed. She has a Licentiate in political science from the University of Ghent.

Career
D'Hose was a parliamentary assistant from 2009–2014 and is Deputy Private Secretary to Sven Gatz.

She has been a City Councillor in Ghent since 2013 and was elected to the Flemish Parliament on 26 May 2019.

D'Hose was appointed to the Belgian Federal Parliament for Open VLD on 4 July 2019, and appointed to the Senate. In the division of powers within the Alexander De Croo government, Open VLD was given the Senate presidency and D'Hose was nominated for the role on 13 October 2020. At 39, she became the youngest person to hold the position. Later that month she became seriously ill with a blood infection and was confined to bed. She tested negative for COVID-19. In January 2022, while she was president of the senate, D'Hose spoke in favour of the abolition of the institution.

Personal life
D'Hose is a vegetarian. She lives with her partner Diederik Pauwelijn.

References

External links
 Official website

See also 

 List of members of the Senate of Belgium, 2019–24

Living people
1981 births
People from Roeselare
Ghent University alumni
Members of the Flemish Parliament
Open Vlaamse Liberalen en Democraten politicians
21st-century Belgian women politicians
21st-century Belgian politicians
Women members of the Senate (Belgium)
Presidents of the Senate (Belgium)
Women legislative speakers
Belgian senators of the 57th legislature